The Dolloff cave spider (Meta dolloff) is a spider native to California, among the rarest spiders of North America.

This species was listed on the 2000 IUCN Red List of Threatened Animals. This doesn't provide legal protection for the species, but the list tracks animals that may become endangered.

Habitat
The Dolloff cave spider has been found in caves in the Empire Cave System near University of California, Santa Cruz, and in the Gray Whale Ranch State Park.

Since the discovery of Meta dolloff in the Empire and Dolloff Caves, Santa Cruz, California, Meta dolloff have been found to regularly exist and reproduce outside of caves in other subterranean habitats such as railroad tunnels and human-dug soil pits at UC Santa Cruz (Krohn & Jones, 2020).

References

Krohn, Alexander R & Jones, Alexander S. (2020). "Meta dolloff Levi, 1980 (Araneae: Tetragnathidae) in cave-like environments," The Pan-Pacific Entomologist 96(3), 185-187.

External links
IUCN Red List of Threatened Animals
Dolloff cave spider

Tetragnathidae
Spiders of the United States
Cave spiders
Endemic fauna of California